State Route 233 (SR 233) is a secondary state highway located in northwestern Middle Tennessee. The length of the route is an estimated total of  through southern Stewart and southwestern Montgomery Counties.

Route description 
SR 233 begins in southern Stewart County at a junction with SR 49 in Carlisle. SR 233 goes on an easterly course, running parallel to the Cumberland River to enter Cumberland City, where it passes by the Cumberland Fossil Plant before entering downtown. It then comes to an intersection with SR 46 and SR 434, where it becomes concurrent with SR 46 to cross the Cumberland River via a ferry. SR 233 separates from SR 46 and winds its way northeast to cross into Montgomery County. SR 233 continues to wind its way northeast through rural areas before coming to an end at a junction with US 79 (SR 76) on the western edge of Woodlawn.

Points of interest

The most notable point of interest along SR 233 is the TVA-operated Cumberland Fossil Plant.

Major intersections

References 

233
233
233